Lycée International Barcelona - Bon Soleil (LIB) is a French international school in Gavà, Barcelona Province, Catalonia, Spain.  it serves petite section through seconde, the second-to-last year of lycée (sixth form college/high school). The school serves ages 3–18.

History
Claire and Sebastian Cabré founded the École Bon Soleil in 1969, initially having 12 students. By 1997 the student population grew to 725. That year the school was renamed to the Collège Bon Soleil, and in 2010 the school received its current name.

Student body
 the school has 1,220 students from 17 nationalities. 72% of the students were Spanish nationals, and 24% were French nationals. Other students had citizenships of Argentina, Belgium, Canada, Italy, the Netherlands, Russia, the United Kingdom, and the United States.

Notes

External links
  Lycée International Barcelona - Bon Soleil

French international schools in Spain
Schools in the Province of Barcelona
International schools in Catalonia
1969 establishments in Spain
Educational institutions established in 1969